The 2016 season was Western Storm's first season, in which they competed in the Women's Cricket Super League, a Twenty20 competition. The side finished second in the initial group stage, therefore progressing to the semi-final, where they beat Loughborough Lightning by 5 wickets. In the final, they played against Southern Vipers but lost the game by 7 wickets to finish as runners-up.

The side represented the South West of England, and was partnered with Somerset County Cricket Club, Gloucestershire County Cricket Club and the University of Exeter. They played two of their home matches at the County Ground, Taunton and one at the County Ground, Bristol. Western Storm's coach was Caroline Foster, and they were captained by Heather Knight.

Squad
Western Storm announced a 15-player squad on 21 April 2016. Age given is at the start of Western Storm's first match of the season (31 July 2016).

Women's Cricket Super League

Season standings

 Advanced to the Final.
 Advanced to the Semi-final.

League stage

Semi-final

Final

Statistics

Batting

Bowling

Fielding

Wicket-keeping

References

Western Storm seasons
2016 in English women's cricket